Yemane Negassi (born 4 April 1946) is an Ethiopian former cyclist. He competed at the 1964 Summer Olympics and the 1968 Summer Olympics.

References

External links
 

1946 births
Living people
Ethiopian male cyclists
Olympic cyclists of Ethiopia
Cyclists at the 1964 Summer Olympics
Cyclists at the 1968 Summer Olympics
Sportspeople from Asmara
20th-century Ethiopian people